Tage Grøndahl (14 October 1931 – April 2014) was a Danish rower. He competed at the 1956 Summer Olympics and the 1960 Summer Olympics.

References

1931 births
2014 deaths
Danish male rowers
Olympic rowers of Denmark
Rowers at the 1956 Summer Olympics
Rowers at the 1960 Summer Olympics
Rowers from Copenhagen